is a town located in Tochigi Prefecture, Japan. ,  the town had an estimated population of 11,684 in 4507 households, and a population density of 180 persons per km².

Geography
Ichikai is located in eastern Tochigi Prefecture.

Surrounding municipalities
Tochigi Prefecture
 Mooka
 Nasukarasuyama
 Mashiko
 Motegi
 Haga
 Takanezawa

Demographics
Per Japanese census data, the population of Ichikai has remained relatively steady over the past 30 years.

History
Ichihane and Kokai villages were created within Haga District on April 1, 1889 with the creation of the modern municipalities system. The two villages merged to form Ichikai village on May 3, 1954. Ichikai was elevated to town status on January 1, 1972.

Government
Ichikai has a mayor-council form of government with a directly elected mayor and a unicameral town council of 12 members. Ichikai, together with the other municipalities in Haga District collectively contributes two members to the Tochigi Prefectural Assembly. In terms of national politics, the town is part of Tochigi 4th district of the lower house of the Diet of Japan.

Economy
The economy of Ichikai is heavily dependent on agriculture. It is also a bedroom community for nearby Utsunomiya, Mooka and Haga.

Education
Ichikai has three public primary schools and one public middle school operated by the town government. The town does not have a high school.

Transportation

Railway
Moka Railway – Mooka Line
 -  -

Highway

Local attractions

References

External links

Official Website 

Towns in Tochigi Prefecture
Ichikai, Tochigi